The San Chay people (also called Sán Chỉ) live in Tuyên Quang Province of the Northeast region of Vietnam, as well as some nearby provinces. The Pinghua language is a form of Chinese language. Their population was 201,398 in 2019.

Many live in remote areas, using slash-and-burn agriculture because those areas are not flat enough for paddy rice production.

They sing  (love songs) and celebrate the  festival (New Rice festival).

The San Chay people are related with the Shanzi People in Guangxi, China.

Literature 
The San Chay have many sayings:

Rice is the most precious
Grain feeds human.
Literature is the secondly most precious
It teaches human knowledge for safe purpose.

References

External links
Official introduction
Ethnologue report
Nét độc đáo trong trang phục phụ nữ dân tộc Đông Bắc

Ethnic groups in Vietnam